Fighting Demons is the fourth studio album by American rapper and singer Juice Wrld. It was posthumously released by Grade A Productions and Interscope Records on December 10, 2021. The album features guest appearances from Justin Bieber, Polo G, Trippie Redd, and Suga. It serves as a tie-in for an HBO-produced documentary titled Juice Wrld: Into the Abyss, released on December 16, 2021.

Release and promotion
On November 11, 2021, Grade A Productions, in conjunction with Juice Wrld's mother, Carmela Wallace, announced the album with the release date of December 10, 2021. The album's lead single, "Already Dead", was released the following day, November 12, 2021, the song peaked at number 20 on the US Billboard Hot 100.

The second single, "Wandered to LA", a collaboration with Canadian singer Justin Bieber, was released on December 3, 2021, the song peaked at number 49 on the Billboard Hot 100.

On December 9, 2021, a tribute event titled Juice Wrld Day was held at Chicago's United Center. At the event, the album was played prior to its release as a listening party. A few special guests appeared to perform and pay respect to Juice, including Ski Mask the Slump God, Trippie Redd, 24kGoldn, and Lucki. Juice's former DJ Mike P hosted the event.

The song "Girl of My Dreams" with South Korean rapper Suga and South Korean pop group BTS was released as a promotional single on the album's release date on December 10, 2021.

"Cigarettes" was released for digital download on February 2, 2022, as the album's third single. The song peaked at number 43 on the Billboard Hot 100. The complete edition of the album was released on the same day, alongside the newly released song "Go Hard 2.0".

The previously released singles from the two-track EP Too Soon.., "Rich and Blind" and "Legends", were later added to the album on March 18, 2022, alongside the newly released song "Sometimes".

Critical reception

Fighting Demons was met with generally positive reviews. At Metacritic, which assigns a normalized rating out of 100 to reviews from professional publications, the album received an average score of 73, based on seven reviews.

A. D. Amorosi of Variety praised many of the guest artists on Fighting Demons, with Justin Bieber's verse on single "Wandered to LA" and Suga's verse on promotional single "Girl of My Dreams" being his two favourites. He mentioned that the album stands out over other post-mortem projects because, in comparison, there are "surprisingly (and happily) few features". Writing for NME, Kyann-Sian Williams gave the project a rating of 4/5 stars citing that Fighting Demons "shows the other side of Juice Wrld, which was never explored enough while he was alive" and that the project manages to deepen his narrative with a level of care rarely seen on posthumous releases. Reviewing the album for HipHopDX, Mackenzie Cummings-Grady stated, "Fighting Demons embodies Juice Wrld in that way: a flawed project with moments of brilliance that feels uncomfortable to listen to but isn't ashamed of its naked humanity. And in that aspect, it becomes a balancing act of the man and the artist, melding the two to create a project that's earnest and authentic – just like Juice Wrld".

Fred Thomas of AllMusic said, "Themes of struggling to overcome depression and drug dependency surface often on Fighting Demons, making it a heavier collection than the sometimes celebratory memoriam of Legends Never Die. It's not an essential piece of the Juice Wrld story, but it's also not without some solid reminders of his greatness". Rolling Stone critic Will Dukes said, "Fighting Demons, his second posthumous album is a tortured but overall grateful memento mori from a talented artist who left us all too soon". In a lukewarm review, Clashs Robin Murray wrote, "Ultimately Fighting Demons works almost as a tribute record, gathering fragments of his undoubted genius. Whether it's a true Juice Wrld album, though, is another matter".

Commercial performance
Fighting Demons debuted at number two on the US Billboard 200 with 119,000 album-equivalent units (including 4,000 pure album sales) in its first week. The album also accumulated a total of 155.49 million on-demand streams of the set's tracks in the week ending December 25.

Track listing

Personnel

 Juice Wrld – vocals
 Michelle Mancini – mastering (1, 4–9, 11–18)
 Colin Leonard – mastering (2, 3)
 Dale Becker – mastering (10)
 Ethan Stevens – mixing (1)
 Manny Marroquin – mixing (2, 4, 5, 7, 9, 11–13, 15–18)
 Max Lord – mixing (3, 6, 8, 14), recording (1, 7, 8, 11, 12, 14–18)
 Serban – mixing (10)
 Joey Galvan – recording (2)
 Louis Bell – recording (4), vocal editing (4), vocal production (4)
 Austin Patton – recording (5, 9)
 Patrick Ehrenblad-Plummer – recording (6)
 Fili Filizzola – recording (10)
 Logan Haynes – recording (13)
 Viko Marley – recording arrangement (11)
 Chris Galland – mastering assistance (1), mixing assistance (2)
 Robin Florent – mastering assistance (1), mixing assistance (2)
 Zach Pereyra – mastering assistance (1), mixing assistance (2, 4, 5, 7, 9, 11–13, 15–18)
 Anthony Vilchis – mixing assistance (4, 5, 7, 9, 11–13, 15–18)
 Evan Jordan – recording assistance (16)
 James Kang – recording assistance (16)
 Camella Wallace – additional vocals (12)

Charts

Weekly charts

Year-end charts

Certifications

Release history

Notes

References

2021 albums
Albums published posthumously
Interscope Records albums
Juice Wrld albums
Albums produced by T-Minus (record producer)
Albums produced by Take a Daytrip
Albums produced by Dr. Luke
Albums produced by Metro Boomin
Albums produced by Harv